The 2017 Peru Census was a detailed enumeration and twelfth national population census of Peru. It was conducted by the Instituto Nacional de Estadística e Informática on Sunday, October 22, 2017. Its full name in Spanish is XII Censo de Población, VII de Vivienda y III de Comunidades Indígenas. The previous census performed in Peru was the 2007 Census.

Questions
The census form had 47 questions referring to households and basic services, housing, methods of travel and formation of families; such as gender, disability and ethnicity. A question on ethnic self-identification was included in the 2017 census.

Results

Population
Comparison between the 2007 and 2017 census.

Ethnic group and religion

Self-identified ethnicity
Responses are for the population of 12 years old and above.

Religion
Distribution of religious denominations.

Note: ‘Other’ religions such as Buddhist, Hindu, Islam.

See also
Instituto Nacional de Estadística e Informática (INEI)
 Census in Peru
 1993 Peru Census
 2005 Peru Census
 2007 Peru Census

References 

Censuses in Peru
Demographics of Peru
2017 in Peru
Peru